Enrique Olivera (8 February 1940 – 4 November 2014) was an Argentine politician who served as Chief of Government of the City of Buenos Aires from December 1999 to August 2000.

Olivera died in Buenos Aires on 4 November 2014, aged 74.

References

1940 births
2014 deaths
Mayors of Buenos Aires
Radical Civic Union politicians
Deputy Chiefs of Government of Buenos Aires
Burials at La Recoleta Cemetery